Anna Lenita Josefine Öqvist (born 23 July 1983) is a Swedish former footballer who played for Montpellier of the French Division 1 Féminine and the Swedish national team. She scored a critical goal at the 86' minute in the 2003 FIFA Women's World Cup semifinals against Canada to put Sweden through to the final. Nicknamed Jossan, she was named the Swedish Rookie of the Year in 2003.

While her primary position is a forward, she was named as a midfielder for the 2008 Summer Olympics. During the tournament she was injured and replaced with Maria Aronsson. Along with Caroline Jönsson, Öqvist tore her anterior cruciate ligament (ACL) before the 2007 FIFA Women's World Cup and was consequently removed from the roster to recover.

Pin-up girl Öqvist attracted attention for a bikini photoshoot in the magazine, Slitz, in the Spring of 2004. She was also filmed swapping jerseys with a male supporter at the 2011 FIFA Women's World Cup in Germany.

Club career

After the 2008 season, Swedish giants Umeå IK wanted Öqvist. Instead she signed a new two-year contract with Linköping. Öqvist suffered a tragedy in her personal life in November 2009 when her 29-year-old sister Caroline had a fatal epileptic seizure. In 2011 Öqvist signed with the top attendance team in Sweden, Tyresö FF. Tyresö boasted three members of the Swedish national team along with players from the Brazilian and Dutch national teams.

In January 2012, it was revealed that Öqvist was pregnant and would miss the entire season, including the 2012 London Olympics. After the birth of daughter Stella, Öqvist returned to play in 2013, but decided to join Kristianstads DFF instead of Tyresö. She lived in nearby Malmö with her partner Stefan Lassen, the Danish professional ice hockey player who was playing for Malmö Redhawks.

After featuring for hosts Sweden at UEFA Women's Euro 2013, Öqvist signed a contract with French club Montpellier. She performed well in France but soon became unsettled because Lassen had moved to Austria to play for Graz 99ers. He described living so far apart from Öqvist and Stella as "unsustainable". In May 2014 Öqvist announced her retirement from football, stating that she wanted to stop while still playing at the top level.

International career

On 18 August 2002, coach Marika Domanski-Lyfors gave Öqvist her senior Sweden women's national football team debut in a 1–0 win over North Korea.

Öqvist was a member of the Sweden team that won a bronze medal at the 2011 World Cup and played in all the matches. On 16 July 2011, she received a red card in the 3rd place game against France after clashing with Sonia Bompastor, but Sweden went on to win 2–1 despite being a player down. Öqvist had scored in the semi final against eventual winners Japan, but Sweden were beaten 3–1.

In February 2014, Öqvist retired from international football after 12 years of playing for Sweden. She had scored 20 goals in her 80 caps.

Matches and goals scored at World Cup & Olympic tournaments
Josefine Öqvist appeared Sweden in two World Cups (USA 2003, Germany 2011) and two Olympic Games (Athens 2004, Beijing 2008).

Matches and goals scored at European Championship tournaments
Josefine Öqvist appeared at two European Championship tournaments: England 2005 and Sweden 2013.

Honours

Linköpings FC

 Damallsvenskan: Winner 2009
 Svenska Cupen: Winner 2006, 2008, 2009
 Svenska Supercupen: Winner 2009, 2010

Country

Sweden
2003 FIFA Women's World Cup: Runner-up
2011 FIFA Women's World Cup: Third place
2004 Summer Olympics in Athens: Fourth place
2008 Summer Olympics in Beijing: Quarter-final
UEFA Women's Euro 2005: Semi-finals
UEFA Women's Euro 2013: Semi-finals

Individual
 UEFA Women's Championship All-Star Team: 2013

References

Match reports

Notes

External links

 Olympic Profile
 National Team Profile 
 Club Team Profile 
 Stats at Footofeminin.fr 
 Josefine Öqvist changing her jersey with a fan
 

1983 births
Living people
Footballers at the 2004 Summer Olympics
Footballers at the 2008 Summer Olympics
Swedish women's footballers
Swedish expatriate women's footballers
Olympic footballers of Sweden
Sweden women's international footballers
2003 FIFA Women's World Cup players
2011 FIFA Women's World Cup players
Montpellier HSC (women) players
Kristianstads DFF players
Linköpings FC players
Tyresö FF players
Damallsvenskan players
Bälinge IF players
Expatriate women's footballers in France
Swedish expatriate sportspeople in France
Footballers from Uppsala
Women's association football wingers
Division 1 Féminine players